Syntypistis umbrosa is a species of moth of the family Notodontidae first described by Shōnen Matsumura in 1927. It is found in India, China (Fujian, Guangdong, Guangxi, Hainan, Sichuan, Yunnan), Taiwan, Myanmar, Malaysia, Indonesia and Vietnam.

References

Moths described in 1927
Notodontidae